The Golla, also spelt as Goalas are a Telugu-speaking pastoral community primarily living in the states of Andhra Pradesh and Telangana with smaller numbers in Karnataka and Tamil Nadu. This caste is called by separate names in different regions, namely Gulla, Gullar (in Karnataka), Gollewar, Gavali and Dhangar (in the Marathwada area of Maharastra State). They are classified as a Backward Caste. 

Gollas are traditionally cowherds, but they engage in both sheep/goat and cattle pastoralism, in that they either herd exclusively sheep, a mixed herd of sheep and goats, or cattle.

Etymology
The Gollas are called Gawalis. One etymology for their name comes from the Sanskrit "Gopala", which in North India passed through Prakrit "Gwala". Several other variants of the name exist in South India, in such forms as Gollavaru, Godlavaru, etc. There are many synonyms by which they are referred to within their community, namely Kadugolla, Oorugolla, Adivigolla, Handigolla and Gopala. Others refer to them only as Golla or Gollaru.

The Gollas also call themselves Yadava. In the early 1920s, castes such as Ahir, Gavli, Golla, Gopa and Goala, which were traditionally engaged in cattle-related occupations, started referring to themselves as Yadav/Yadava. They claimed that they were related to the Abhiras and Yadavas of the Puranas, which were held to be synonymous and associated with Lord Krishna, a cowherd.

Sub-castes
The community, due to its size, has a great number of sub-castes, including: Yerra, Mushti, Masaram, Karine, Pakinati, Puja, Modateetta, Nallasadana, Gujarathi, Gampa, Peyya, Veyya, Kuruma and Sidda. The Kannada-speaking Hanabaru or Krishna Golla are also considered to be a sub-caste.

Assimilation into Yadav community

In 1923, leaders from the North Indian Ahir and Maharashtraian Gavli communities formed All India Yadav Mahasabha (AIYM) to promote Yadava identity amongst regional castes whose occupation was associated with cattle, i.e, cowherds, herdsmen, milk-sellers. They claimed that they were related to the Yadu dynasty of the Puranas, hence the term Yadav, through the Abhira tribe. Lord Krishna, a cowherd, was the hero-god of Abhiras. The AIYM insisted that all these regional castes known by different names, call themselves Yadav/Yadava and that each person have Yadav as his last name, and this was enthusiastically followed by various communities who were traditionally involved in cattle related occupations. The Gollas of Hyderabad state, under the leadership of their regional association, the Hyderabad Rashtra Yadava Mahajana Samajam, requested to the Census Commissioner for a change in their caste names Golla, Gawli, Gollawar and Ahir to Yadava. Similarly, in 1930, the government of Madras state directed the adoption of the term "Yadava", in place of Golla, Idaiyan, Gopa, Gopi or Gowla, in all official documents. This was in response to an appeal made by the Yadukula Maha Sangham of east Godavari District.

Religion 
Gollas are both Vaishnavites and Saivites. They put on a vertical yellow or red streak on their forehead, indicating Vaishnavism, and worship a deity, Mallanna, who is a form of Shiva. The Yerra (or Kilari Gollas) regard themselves as superior to other Gollas and put on a sacred thread during marriages.

Social status
Gollas were looked upon fairly high; equally with the agricultural castes such as the Kapu, Kamma, and Balija, Gollas were allowed to intermingle with these castes. The Gollas are classified as Other Backward Class in the Indian System of Reservation.

Tirumala Tirupati Devasthanams 
 In June 2020, Andhra Pradesh state government restored 'Golla Mirasi', also known as 'Golla Mandapam', the hereditary rights of the Golla community pertaining to certain rituals at Tirumala temple.

See also
Gollewar
Naidu
Gavli
Dhangar
Yadava

References

Social groups of Andhra Pradesh
Herding castes
Other Backward Classes of Karnataka
Social groups of Telangana
Social groups of Tamil Nadu